William Atherton (January 10, 1793 – September 11, 1863) was an American soldier, rifleman and veteran of the War of 1812 from Shelbyville, Kentucky. He was a private in Captain  John Simpson's company  of the 1st Rifle Regiment. He served under William Henry Harrison. Atherton wrote a journal that detailed his war service within the Kentucky militia, including their defeat and subsequent massacre at River Raisin by opposing forces, and his subsequent capture and imprisonment.

Battle of Frenchtown

Atherton was one of the 25,010 Kentuckians who served in war fighting against both the British and their Native Americans allies. This represented about five out of every six men then of military age.

Mustered at the age of seventeen, he was an eighteen year old soldier during the Battle of Frenchtown, which took place in Michigan
during January 1813. He described in his own postwar narrative the methods of fighting used by the enemy forces (retreat and fire on advancing on American forces), which ultimately gave the opposing forces superiority on the battlefield.

His subsequent experiences being held captive by the Potawatomi, a Native American tribe, followed by internment in Quebec, is taught today at schools in the United States. His journal includes his personal observations of many Native American customs. When describing his months of captivity, he found the British officers much more savage than their native allies.

In contrast to John O'Fallon, who less than three months after Frenchtown was at Fort Meigs, as Harrison's acting assistant adjutant general, Atherton was held prisoner until June 1814, when he was released in a prisoner exchange.

His narrative provides a rare common soldier's perspective of the War of 1812, and as such his account, considered to be a critical source for studying the conflict. It also gives a gruesome testimony to how adept the opposing forces were at bush fighting.  Atherton stated:

Personal
Atherton was born in what had been one year prior to his birth known as Kentucky County, Virginia. His parents being early settlers. He described himself as being born in Virginia.

He returned to Shelby County, Kentucky after the war of 1812 and became a farmer. He married Mary "Polly" Lyons and moved to Greencastle, Indiana prior to 1850. 

Atherton eventually became an ordained minister and was known as Reverend William Atherton, a Methodist minister. In 1842, he reluctantly published his account of the suffering & defeat of the North-Western Army, under General 
James Winchester, the massacre of the U.S. prisoners and his own sixteen months imprisonment, with the following goal:

 

In 1890, historians described accurate how Atherton described the hardships that both he and others endured.

Death and legacy
Atherton died on September 11, 1863 . He is buried at Greencastle City Cemetery in Greencastle, Indiana.

Atherton's account has frequently been referenced in secondary histories of the war, notably in Pierre Berton's popular histories "The Invasion of Canada and Flames Across the Border".

Atherton's story has commonly been featured in museum exhibits and in documentaries on the War of 1812, including PBS's "The War of 1812" (2011).

The American public broadcaster PBS, reviewed Atherton's narrative  as follows:
An audio recording of his historical narrative has been produced, Read by James E. Carson.

Biography
Narrative of the suffering & defeat of the north-western army, under General Winchester: massacre of the prisoners: sixteen months imprisonment  of the writer and others with the Indians and British by William Atherton. Printed for the author by A. G. Hodges, of Frankfort, KY in 1842.
 "The Men Were Sick of the Place" : Soldier Illness and Environment in the War of 1812. Miller, Joseph R.University of Maine.
 Herrera, R. (2013). TOWARD AN AMERICAN ARMY: U.S. SOLDIERS, THE WAR OF 1812, AND NATIONAL IDENTITY. Army History, (88), 42–57. Retrieved October 5, 2020,

See also
 Battle of Frenchtown
 Shadrack Byfield, a British foot soldier's own account of the Battle of Frenchtown.

External links

Find a grave record for William  Atherton
 Official battlefield site
 Description of the battle at the city of Monroe website

References

1793 births
1863 deaths
American Revolutionary War prisoners of war held by Great Britain
United States Army personnel of the War of 1812
People from Kentucky in the War of 1812
War of 1812 prisoners of war held by the United Kingdom

People from Shelbyville, Kentucky
People from Greencastle, Indiana
19th-century American male writers
19th-century Methodist ministers